Atanas Ioan Trică (born 9 July 2004) is a Romanian professional footballer who plays as a winger for Liga II club CSA Steaua București, on loan from Universitatea Craiova. He made his debut in the Liga I for Universitatea Craiova.

Club career
Trică scored his first goal for Universitatea Craiova on 10 February 2022, in a 6–1 Liga I win over Dinamo București.

Personal life
Trică's father, Eugen, and maternal grandfather, Ilie Balaci, were also professional footballers.

Career statistics

Club

Honours
Universitatea Craiova
Cupa României: 2020–21

References

External links

 
 

2004 births
Living people
Footballers from Bucharest
Romanian footballers
Romania youth international footballers
Association football forwards
Liga I players
CS Universitatea Craiova players
Liga II players
CSA Steaua București footballers